Lycée les Sept Mares (L7M) is a senior high school/sixth form college in Maurepas, Yvelines, France, in the Paris metropolitan area.

References

External links
 Lycée les Sept Mares 

Lycées in Yvelines
Schools in Saint-Quentin-en-Yvelines